Steven Hawe (born 23 December 1980) is a Northern Irish former footballer who played as a defender for both Blackpool and Halifax Town in the Football League Third Division.
He is the father of Luke who plays for Ballymena academy.

Career statistics

Club

References

External links

1980 births
Living people
Association footballers from Northern Ireland
Association football defenders
Blackburn Rovers F.C. players
Blackpool F.C. players
FC Halifax Town players
Portadown F.C. players
Coagh United F.C. players
Glenavon F.C. players
People from Magherafelt